Caelostomus planoculatus is a species of ground beetle in the subfamily Pterostichinae. It was described by Jeannel in 1948.

References

Caelostomus
Beetles described in 1948